Lucania was a Byzantine province (theme) in southern Italy that was probably established c. 968, under Emperor Nikephoros II Phokas.

History

It was situated between the two older Byzantine provinces of Longobardia in the east and Calabria in the west, and was formed to encompass the areas in the mostly Lombard-populated theme of Longobardia where Byzantine Greeks from Calabria had settled in the early 10th century (the regions of Latinianon, Lagonegro and Mercurion). 

Tursi was chosen as the theme's capital and also as the seat of a new metropolitan bishopric to encompass the province. The theme of Lucania was probably under the overall authority of the Catepan of Italy at Bari.

The Lucania Theme lasted nearly one hundred years: from 968 to 1050 AD. It was fully conquered by the Normans, with the help of the Longobards of the Principate of Salerno.

The province corresponds roughly to the modern Italian region of Basilicata.

Notes

See also
 Catapanate of Italy

Sources

Italian states
Geographical, historical and cultural regions of Italy
Byzantine Italy
Themes of the Byzantine Empire
History of Basilicata
States and territories established in the 960s
States and territories disestablished in the 1050s